Nagaland State Library is a Metropolitan Library in Kohima, Nagaland, India. It is located in Police Reserve Hill on the road leading to Jotsoma.

History 
Nagaland State Library was established in 1981 under the Nagaland Government's Department of Arts & Culture.

Today the library has a collection of more than 58,000 books. As of 2019, the library has a total number of 3796 registered members.

See also 
 List of libraries in India

References

External links 

Buildings and structures in Kohima
Libraries in Kohima
Education in Kohima
Nagaland
Libraries established in 1981